The Ram might refer to:

Aries (constellation), a constellation of stars in the northern celestial hemisphere
Aries (astrology), a sign of the zodiac
The Ram (fairy tale), a French fairy tale
 Randy "The Ram" Robinson, the main character of the 2008 film The Wrestler
The Fordham Ram, journal of record of Fordham University

See also
Ram (disambiguation)